Collection is a compilation album written and mostly performed by Mike Oldfield.

Track listing

CD one 
 "Moonlight Shadow" – 3:36
 "To France" – 4:43
 "Five Miles Out" – 4:15
 "Shadow on the Wall" (12" version) – 5:18
 "Foreign Affair" – 3:55
 "Sentinel" – 3:56
 "Family Man" – 3:46
 "Heaven's Open" – 4:26
 "Pictures in the Dark" – 4:20
 "Innocent" – 3:30
 "Islands" – 4:18
 "Incantations" (Part four excerpt) – 4:38

CD two 
 "Tubular Bells" (Opening theme) – 4:17
 "Etude" – 3:06
 "Ommadawn" (Excerpt) – 3:39
 "In Dulci Jubilo" – 2:51
 "Good News" – 1:45
 "Pran's Theme" (1 & 2) – 2:31
 "Pran's Departure" – 2:07
 "Hergest Ridge" (Part one) – 21:28
 "Portsmouth" – 2:00

External links 
 Mike Oldfield discography - Collection at Tubular.net

Mike Oldfield compilation albums
2002 compilation albums
Virgin Records compilation albums